In linguistics, a monosyllable is a word or utterance of only one syllable. It is most commonly studied in the fields of phonology and morphology and it has no semantic content. The word has originated from the Greek language.

"Yes", "no", "jump", "buy", "heat", "sure", "cough", and "and" are examples of monosyllables. Some of the longest monosyllabic words in the English language, all containing nine letters each, are "screeched," "schlepped," "scratched," "scrounged," "scrunched," "stretched," "straights," and "strengths."

References

External links
 

Linguistic units
Phonotactics
Types of verses